Afghan diaspora refers to the Afghan people that reside and work outside of Afghanistan. They include natives and citizens of Afghanistan who have immigrated to other countries. The majority of the diaspora has been formed by Afghan refugees since the start of the Soviet–Afghan War in 1979; the largest numbers temporarily reside in Iran and Pakistan. As stateless refugees or asylum seekers, they are protected by the well-established non-refoulement principle and the U.N. Convention Against Torture. The ones having at least one American parent are further protected by United States laws.

Outside the immediate region of Afghanistan, the largest and oldest communities of Afghans exist in Germany; large communities also exist in the United States, the United Arab Emirates, Russia, Turkey, Canada, United Kingdom, Sweden, Netherlands, Australia and Austria. Some are nationals and citizens of the countries in those continents, especially those in the United States, Canada, Germany, Australia and New Zealand.

Traditionally, the borders between Afghanistan and its southern and eastern neighboring countries have been fluid and vague. Like other nations that were created by European empires, the borders of Afghanistan with neighboring countries often do not follow ethnic divisions, and several native ethnic groups are found on both sides of Afghanistan's border. This means that historically there was much movement across present day barriers.

History

After the 1979 Soviet invasion of Afghanistan, Afghan civilians began escaping to neighboring Pakistan and Iran where they were welcomed by the governments of those countries. From there many immigrated to North America, Europe and Oceania. Smaller number went north and began residing in various cities across the then Soviet Union. Some went to India, Saudi Arabia, and elsewhere within the Asian continent.

After the withdrawal of Soviet forces in February 1989, large number of Afghans began returning to their homeland, but after the mujahideen took control of the country in 1992 they again began migrated to neighboring countries. From there the United Nations High Commissioner for Refugees (UNHCR), the International Organization for Migration (IOM), the United States Refugee Admissions Program (USRAP) and many others began helping Afghans to resettle in Europe, North America and Oceania.

Since March 2002, around 4.4 million Afghan refugees have been repatriated to Afghanistan with the assistance of the UNHCR and IOM. Nearly 1.3 million still remain in Pakistan and 2.5 million or so in Iran. A number of countries that were part of the International Security Assistance Force (ISAF) have granted permanent residency to tens of thousands of eligible Afghans. This creates a legal pathway for those Afghans to become citizens of those countries. Native people of Afghanistan now reside in at least 96 countries around the world. Some of those returning from Pakistan have complained that "they have been beaten and slapped and told nobody in Pakistan wants them anymore." Others have regarded Pakistan as their home because they were born there. Returnees from Iran experience similar or worst punishments. A number of returnees to Afghanistan make new journeys to the European Union (EU) to seek asylum there.

Afghan diaspora around the world

Numerous local places around the world with a high concentration of Afghans have been dubbed "Little Kabul", including Centerville District in Fremont, California, U.S., Steindamm in Hamburg, Germany, Lajpat Nagar in Delhi, India, and Hotel Sevastopol in Moscow, Russia.

Western Asia

Approximately 780,000 registered citizens of Afghanistan are temporarily residing in Iran under the care and protection of the UNHCR. According to Afghanistan's Ministry of Refugees, the total number of Afghans in Iran is around 3 million. The UNHCR stated in 2020 that little over 2 million undocumented citizens of Afghanistan were residing in various parts of the country. According to IOM, over 1.1 million of them were repatriated to Afghanistan in 2021. Over 600,000 have returned to Afghanistan in 2022. According to Iran's Ambassador Hassan Kazemi Qomi, half of Iran's foreign investors are Afghans.

Significant number of Afghans also reside in Turkey. They include business investors, registered refugees, migrant workers, and those trying to make their way to Europe. Around 300,000 reside in the United Arab Emirates (UAE) where many are investors in Dubai and Abu Dhabi. Some of them could be Iranians or Pakistanis using false Afghan passports. Approximately 10,000 Afghans reside in Israel. They are Israelis by nationality. Between 3,500 and 4,000 Afghans reside in Qatar.

South Asia

Nearly 1.3 million registered citizens of Afghanistan are temporarily residing in Pakistan. Of these, 58.1% reside and work in Khyber Pakhtunkhwa, 22.8% in Balochistan, 11.7% in Punjab, 4.6% in Sindh, 2.4% in the capital Islamabad and 0.3% in Azad Kashmir. They are also under the care and protection of the UNHCR. Over one million returned to Afghanistan in 2022. After the return of the Taliban government, most Afghans travel to Islamabad to obtain visas or other travel documents to other countries around the world.

Around 15,806 Afghans reside in India, mostly in the capital Delhi. A small number also reside in Nepal. Most of these fled Afghanistan as refugees but came to the capital Kathmandu from Delhi in for better aspirations.

North and Central Asia

There may be as much as 150,000 Afghan refugees in Russia, a third of them reside and work in Moscow. 

Approximately 10,000 Afghans are said to be residing in Uzbekistan. Around 1,000 are believed to be in Tashkent. In 2005, their total number in that country was approximately 2,500. 

The number of Afghans in Tajikistan is approximately 6,775 as of 2021. Hundreds are also known to be residing elsewhere. It is believed some 2,500 and probably over 3,000 are in Kazakhstan.

East and Southeast Asia
In December 2020, there were 7,629 registered Afghan refugees residing in Indonesia under the care and protection of the UNHCR. The government of Japan reported 3,509 natives of Afghanistan residing in its country. Malaysia has approximately 1,100 Afghans. In China, there are "a few thousand" Afghans residing there, including traders based in the international trade city of Yiwu. Small number of natives from Afghanistan also reside and work in Thailand, South Korea, Hong Kong, and in the Philippines.

Europe

Native people from Afghanistan can be found all over Europe. Germany has the largest Afghan community in Europe. In the end of 2020, a total of 271,805 persons with Afghan citizenship resided in Germany, including refugees and asylum seekers. They are the third largest foreign group residing and working in the city of Hamburg, after the Poles and the Turks.

Elsewhere in Europe various size communities of Afghans exist in the United Kingdom, Sweden, Austria, the Netherlands, Denmark, Norway, Belgium, Switzerland, France, Greece, Italy, Finland, Republic of Ireland, etc. Some have long been citizens of those countries while others are there to seek asylum. The ones that are denied such relief are sent back to Afghanistan. It was reported in 2001 that about 20,000 Afghans were residing in Ukraine. Of these, 15,000 were living in Kyiv and remaining in the Dnieper region.

Between 1992 and 2002, Germany received the highest asylum requests from Afghans in Europe, a total of 57,600. The Netherlands received 36,500 refugees and asylum seekers, the United Kingdom received 29,400, Austria 25,800, Denmark 7,300 and Sweden 3,100. All other countries in the (pre-2004) EU received less than 2,000 asylum requests each from Afghan citizens. Many also arrived during the recent migrant crisis, especially to Germany, Sweden and Austria.

Americas

The United States has one of the largest and oldest Afghan population in the Americas, with about 250,000 residing in that country as of 2022. The early ones had arrived before the 1930s. Most were lawfully admitted under  after the Refugee Act of 1980 went into effect. They reside and work in nearly all U.S. states, including in California, New York, Arizona, Texas, Georgia, Michigan, Idaho, Missouri, Illinois, Pennsylvania, Florida, North Carolina, Massachusetts, Washington, Maryland, Connecticut,  Colorado, Ohio, Utah, New Mexico, Oregon, and Tennessee. Their total number is expected to increase in the coming years.

Afghan Canadians form the second largest Afghan community in North America after Afghan Americans. Over 83,995 Afghan natives are settled in Canada and are Canadian citizens. The overwhelming majority of them reside in and around the city of Toronto. The remaining can be found in Vancouver, Ottawa, Montreal, Winnipeg, Edmonton, Calgary, etc.

Small number of natives from Afghanistan are also reported to be residing and working in Ecuador, Brazil, Cuba, Chile, Argentina, Venezuela, Colombia, Dominican Republic, Uruguay, Panama, Costa Rica, Mexico, Cayman Islands, and Trinidad and Tobago.

Oceania

Afghans have immigrated to Australia since the mid-19th century. The Ghan passenger train that travels between Adelaide in the south and Darwin in the north is named after them. There are over 59,797 Afghan Australians. They reside in a number of cities but mainly in Melbourne, Sydney, Adelaide, Perth and Brisbane. Around 3,414 Afghans reside in New Zealand. They are all citizens of those two countries. Small number of natives from Afghanistan reportedly reside and work in the islands of Papua New Guinea, Nauru, and Fiji.

Africa
Small number of natives from Afghanistan are also reported to be residing and working in Egypt, Kenya, Madagascar, South Africa, Morocco, Algeria, Chad, Ethiopia, and Nigeria.

2,000 Afghan refugees have been accepted into Uganda following August 2021, along with 250 in Rwanda.

See also

 Afghan refugees
 Hazara diaspora
 Pashtun diaspora

References

External links
 Tropical welcome for Afghans in Brazil